Lena Guilbert Brown Ford, middle name sometimes listed as Gilbert, (1870 – March 7, 1918) was a lyricist, best known for "Keep the Home Fires Burning" which she wrote during the First World War.

She was born Lena Guilbert Brown in Venango County, Pennsylvania and attended Elmira College, graduating in 1887. She married physician Harry Hale Ford and settled in Elmira, later divorcing him and relocating, with her mother and son, to London, England, where they would remain for twenty years. During World War I, Ford opened her home to soldiers and took care of them.

While in Britain she met Ivor Novello, with whom she collaborated to produce "Keep the Home Fires Burning" in 1914. It was the first major success for Novello and the only one for Ford. Among Ford's other published musical works are "When God Gave You to Me", "We Are Coming, Mother England", and "God Guard You" (with Westell Gordon).

Ford and her thirty-year-old son Walter were the first United States citizens to become fatalities of a German air raid on London, their home being hit by one of eighteen bombs that fell on the city on the night of  7/8 March 1918. Mrs. Brown, Ford's mother, was only hurt in the bombing. Their remains were returned to and interred in the United States.

References

Sources
 New York Evening Telegram, March 11, 1918, "American Woman Author and Son Air Raid Victims", p. 8.
 Auburn (New York) Citizen, March 11, 1918, "Author of 'Keep the Home Fires Burning' is Killed", p. 1.
 New York Times, March 13, 1918, "Mrs. Ford's Estate Raises Knotty Point".
 The Music Trade Review, April 13, 1918, "Royalty Question Before Courts", p. 57.
 Alice Zinska Snyder and Milton Valentine Snyder (1921), Paris Days and London Nights, E.P. Dutton & Company, p. 39.

External links
 
 

American women poets
American women in World War I
American lyricists
American World War I poets
Civilians killed in World War I
1870 births
1918 deaths
People from Venango County, Pennsylvania
Writers from Pennsylvania
Writers from London
American expatriates in England
Elmira College alumni
20th-century American poets
20th-century American women writers
Songwriters from Pennsylvania